The 2014 FIBA Basketball World Cup was the 17th edition of the FIBA Basketball World Cup, the tournament previously known as the FIBA World Championship. Hosted by Spain, it was the last tournament to be held on the then-current four-year cycle. The next FIBA World Cup was held five years later, in 2019, to reset the four-year-cycle on a different year than the FIFA World Cup.

The United States won their fifth world championship, after beating silver medal-winning Serbia in the Final. France claimed the third place, while Lithuania finished fourth in the tournament.

Host selection

FIBA opened the bidding process on 10 January 2008 and all the letters of intent were submitted on 30 April 2008.
Nine countries showed interest in hosting the event, as in order, they were Spain, France, Denmark, Russia, Saudi Arabia, Qatar, Italy, Greece, and China.

Among the nine, only three were shortlisted by FIBA: China which would have hosted the 2009 FIBA Asia Championship later that year, Italy which last hosted a FIBA tournament in EuroBasket Women 2007, and FIBA EuroBasket 2007 host Spain.

On 23 May 2009, after voting by the FIBA Central Board in Geneva in which the Chinese and Spanish representatives abstained, China was the first to be eliminated in the first round of voting. In the final round, Arvydas Sabonis and Saša Djordjević announced that Spain won the hosting rights with eleven votes as opposed to Italy's eight.

Venues
The Palacio de Deportes de la Comunidad de Madrid was the main venue, hosting the final and half of the matches in the final round. While no arenas from the 1986 FIBA World Championship were reused, the current Madrid arena was built on the site of the original venue that was destroyed by fire in 2001, which was a venue used in 1986. Amongst venues used in FIBA EuroBasket 2007, the arenas in Granada, Seville and Madrid were reused. One arena, the Gran Canaria Arena, was the only new venue, being built after the tournament was awarded to Spain. The other cities  hosted a group.

On 17 April 2010, Barcelona was added to the list of cities to hold games, bringing the total venues to six. This was Barcelona's first time being part of a major international event in basketball since the 1997 EuroBasket, in which the Palau Sant Jordi hosted the final stages. Barcelona will host half of the games in the knockout stage, including a semifinal.

Below is a list of the confirmed venues which were used to host games during the 2014 FIBA Basketball World Cup. Connor Floor was the official supplier of the basketball courts for each of the six sites.

Qualification

There were 24 teams taking part in the 2014 World Cup of Basketball. After the 2012 Olympics, the continental allocation for FIBA Americas was reduced by one when the United States won the Olympic tournament, automatically qualifying them for the 2014 World Cup.
 Host nation: 1 berth
 2012 Summer Olympics: 12 teams competing for 1 berth, removed from that country's FIBA zone
 FIBA Asia: 15 teams competing for 3 berths
 FIBA Oceania: 2 teams competing for 2 berths
 FIBA Africa: 16 teams competing for 3 berths
 FIBA Americas: 10 teams competing for 4 berths
 FIBA Europe: 24 teams competing for 6 berths
 Wild card: 4 berths

Qualified teams
As of 21 September 2013, twenty teams had already qualified for the final tournament in 2014. To complete the 24-team tournament, FIBA would announce the four wild cards after a meeting in Barcelona on 1–2 February 2014; they could have announced an initial list of teams that would be considered after a Buenos Aires meeting on 23–24 November 2013. But later the FIBA Central Board decided not to trim the list of wild card applicants on their Buenos Aires meeting, making all 15 teams eligible to be selected on the February meeting at Barcelona.

Suspension of Senegal
On the FIBA Central Board meeting in Buenos Aires, FIBA suspended the basketball federations of Guatemala, Morocco and Senegal indefinitely "due to their inability to properly function as the governing body for basketball in their respective countries." The Senegalese federation was suspended reportedly due to age fabrication in the 2013 FIBA Under-19 World Championship for Men and for Women; the Senegalese federation was dissolved as a result. On 2 February, FIBA lifted the suspension on the Senegalese federation after they complied with all of the requirements imposed by the FIBA, clearing the way for the participation of its national team in the tournament.

Rule and format changes
This was the first time the NBA-style 4.90m rectangular free throw lane, the 1.25m restricted arc, and extended three point line (6.6 m [21' 8"] from the basket at the corners; 6.75 m [22' 1.75"] elsewhere) took effect in the tournament.

The final round was held in two arenas: in the Palacio de Deportes de la Comunidad de Madrid and Palau Sant Jordi, as opposed to a singular arena in 2010. Also, the arrangement of the round of 16 match-ups in the bracket were changed. In 2010, a team from Group A or B can meet a team from Group C or D as early in the quarterfinals, and cannot meet their groupmates until the semifinals. In 2014, teams from Groups A and B were in one half of the bracket played in Madrid, while teams from Groups C and D were in the other half and played in Barcelona; teams from Groups A and B could not meet teams from Group C or D until the final or third-place playoff, and could meet their groupmates as early as the quarterfinals.

In 2010, the round of 16 games were held in a span of four days, or two matches per day; in 2014, there would be four games per day, and the round of 16 will be done in two days. From the semifinals onward, unlike in 2010 where the semifinals were held in one day, and the third-place playoff and the final on the next day, the semifinals in 2014 were held on two days, followed by the third-place playoff the next day, and the final on the day after, or one game per day. Finally, the classification round for 5th place was also eliminated.

Draw
The draw was held on 3 February 2014 at 19:00 CET at the Palau de la Música Catalana, Barcelona. On 2 February, FIBA released the pots on how the teams would be drawn. "Pot 1" included the top 4 teams in the FIBA World Rankings, while the other pots were grouped on geographical and sporting criteria.

There were no restrictions in drawing teams from pots except for the following:
 and the United States, as the top 2 teams, were to be placed on opposite sides of the bracket for knockout play. As a result, Spain went to Group A and the US to Group C. The other teams in the pot would thus be drawn to either Group B or D.
 could not be placed in a group that already contained .  They were also required to be put into a group that already had two European teams.

After a team's group was drawn, another draw followed to determine their position in the group, and consequently, the order of games to be played. In this draw, there were four pots, "Pot A" to "Pot D", each corresponding to each preliminary round group, containing six numbers; here, the pot corresponding to the drawn group of a team was drawn to determine its position in the order of games, such as "A1" to "A6", for Group A teams. Finally, after the groupings and order of games were determined, FIBA assigned one group to each preliminary round host city.

Former Spanish international Juan Antonio San Epifanio, Croatia's Dino Rađa, José Ortiz of Puerto Rico and Angolan Jean-Jacques Conceição assisted in the draw.

Group A, which included European champions France, hosts Spain, and traditional powerhouse Serbia has been labeled as the "group of death". The Americans, meanwhile, avoided the "bracket of death" of Groups A and B by landing in Group C, setting up a rematch of the 2010 final against Turkey, which were selected as wild cards, and a possible late knockout match-up against European runners-up Lithuania.

Squads

Each team had a roster of 12 players; a team could opt to have one naturalized player from its roster. The final rosters had to be finalized at the team managers' meeting at the night prior to the first game. The final roster of 12 players per team must have been taken from a list of at most 24 players submitted to FIBA two months before the beginning of the championship.

Preparation matches

2014 South American Basketball Championship

The 2014 South American Basketball Championship in Isla Margarita, Venezuela was a qualifying tournament for the 2015 FIBA Americas Championship and for the 2015 Pan-American Games.  defeated World Cup participants  (who played with its  "B" team) to win the title; the other team in the World Cup,  (who also played with its "B" team), finished in third place defeating . All four teams qualified to the 2015 FIBA Americas Championship while only the top three teams qualified to the 2015 Pan-American Games.

2014 FIBA Asia Cup

2014 Centrobasket

The 2014 Centrobasket in Tepic, Mexico is a qualifying tournament for the 2015 FIBA Americas Championship and for the 2015 Pan-American Games. The three teams in the World Cup occupied the top three places.  defeated  in the final, while  finished third place defeating . All four teams qualified to the 2015 FIBA Americas Championship while only the top three teams qualified to the 2015 Pan-American Games.

2014 William Jones Cup

The 2014 William Jones Cup was a friendly tournament in New Taipei, Taiwan.  is the only World Cup team participated; they finished third. Iran sent their "B-team", while South Korea sent in a Korean Basketball League team.

2014 Antibes International Basketball Tournament

 won this friendly tournament in Antibes, France organized by Fédération Française de Basket-Ball.

Preliminary round

How teams are ranked:
Highest number of points earned, with each game result having a corresponding point:
Win: 2 points
Loss: 1 point
Loss by default: 1 point, with a final score of 2–0 for the opponents of the defaulting team if the latter team is not trailing or if the score is tied, or the score at the time of stoppage if they are trailing.
Loss by forfeit: 0 points, with a final score of 20–0 for the opponents of the forfeiting team.
Head-to-head record via points system above
Goal average on games among tied teams
Goal average on all group games
Drawing of lots

Group A

Venue: Palacio Municipal de Deportes de Granada, Granada

Group B

Venue: Palacio Municipal de Deportes San Pablo, Seville

Group C

Venue: Bizkaia Arena, Barakaldo

Group D

Venue: Gran Canaria Arena, Las Palmas

Final round

Round of 16

Quarterfinals

Semifinals

Third place playoff

Final

Statistics

Player tournament averages

Team tournament averages

Tournament game highs

Final rankings

Method of breaking ties:
Ranked 17th–24th:
Place in preliminary round group (5th placed teams ranked 17th–20th; 6th placed teams ranked 21st–24th)
Win–loss record in preliminary round group
Goal average in preliminary round group
Ranked 5th–16th:
Furthest round eliminated
Win–loss record in preliminary round group
Place in preliminary round group
Goal average in preliminary round group
Ranked 1st–4th:
Result of final and third-place playoff

Awards

All-Tournament Team

  Kyrie Irving – MVP 
  Miloš Teodosić
  Nicolas Batum
  Kenneth Faried
  Pau Gasol

Special Awards
 Philippines – MVF Best Country (on Fan support throughout the tournament)

Controversies

Australia's alleged tanking 
At their final group matches between Australia and Angola, Australia rested their key players towards the end of the game, allowing for Angola to win 91–83, after the Boomers led at the half by double digits. Australia fell to third place, thereby allowing them to face the United States at the semifinals instead of the quarterfinals if they finished second. This so-called "tanking" was blasted by Goran Dragić, whose Slovenian team were defeated by Lithuania in the final group match, dropping them to second place, causing them to face the Americans instead in the quarterfinals if they reach that far. Dragic implored on FIBA "to do something about" it.

Right after Australia's elimination by Turkey in the first round, FIBA announced that the Boomers were under investigation for tanking. Australia coach Andrej Lemanis rejected the accusation that they tanked, saying he rested his players for the next stage due to the heavy tournament schedule, adding that: "We always, as Australians, compete the right way".

On 26 November 2014, Australia was cleared of tanking by FIBA.

Marketing

Road show and trophy tour
A tour of the Naismith Trophy was held to promote the event. The trophy was on display at the 2014 NBA All-Star Game in New Orleans in February 2014, then the tour visited several countries in Latin America, Europe and the Philippines from April to mid-July. It also visited South Africa during the finals of the South African Premier Basketball League in August.

Prior to this, FIBA and the Spanish Basketball Federation held a road show that ran from 2012 to 2014 visiting key Spanish cities, with some of the final stops being the host cities, and at Ljubljana, Slovenia during FIBA EuroBasket 2013.

Ball
On 30 January, FIBA revealed the official ball that would be used in the World Cup. Designed by Molten, it "will be the first time ever a custom designed basketball has been developed exclusively for an individual event".

Mascots

On 31 January, FIBA revealed the mascots of the World Cup: Olé and Hop. Olé and Hop's name came from the word "alley-oop"; they are directly inspired from the 2014 World Cup logo, and will have a tour of host cities leading up to the championship.

Theme song
"Sube la Copa" by Huecco was named the official theme song of the 2014 FIBA Basketball World Cup. The song, starting from 27 August, can be downloaded on iTunes, Spotify and Deezer, with all of the proceeds going to the FEB's Casa Espana, Huecco's Fundacion Dame Vida, and FIBA's International Basketball Foundation.

Referees
The following referees were selected for the tournament.

  Carlos Julio
  Alejandro Chiti
  Michael Aylen
  Vaughan Mayberry
  Marcos Benito
  Cristiano Maranho
  Arnaud Kom Njilo
  Stephen Seibel
  Michael Weiland
  Sreten Radović
  Reynaldo Mercedes
  Joseph Bissang
  Eddie Viator
  Robert Lottermoser
  Christos Christodoulou
  Elias Koromilas
  Guerrino Cerebuch
  Luigi Lamonica
  Yuji Hirahara
  Yevgeniy Mikheyev
  Mohammad Al-Amiri
  Oļegs Latiševs
  José Reyes
  Kingsley Ojeaburu
  Ferdinand Pascual
  Fernando Rocha
  Jorge Vázquez
  Luis Vázquez
  Ilija Belošević
  Milivoje Jovčić
  Matej Boltauzer
  Juan Arteaga
  Juan González
  Benjamin Jiménez
  Miguel Pérez
  Rüştü Nuran
  Borys Ryzhyk
  Steven Anderson
  Anthony Jordan
  Alejandro Sánchez

See also

 2014 FIBA World Championship for Women

References

External links

 
2014
2014 in basketball
2014–15 in Spanish basketball
International basketball competitions hosted by Spain
August 2014 sports events in Europe
September 2014 sports events in Europe
International basketball competitions hosted by Catalonia